Nipponaphera goniata is a species of sea snail, a marine gastropod mollusk in the family Cancellariidae, the nutmeg snails.

Description
The length of the shell attains 16.1 mm.

Distribution
This marine species occurs off New Caledonia.

References

External links
 Bouchet P. & Petit R.E. (2002). New species of deep-water Cancellariidae (Gastropoda) from the southwestern Pacific. The Nautilus 116(3): 95-104.

goniata
Gastropods described in 2002